Spank! The Fifty Shades Parody is an unauthorized musical satire of E.L. James' Fifty Shades of Grey created by Mills Entertainment.  The show is currently touring Canada, United States, and Australia.    The production was directed by Jim Millan and stars three different casts consisting of three actors per cast (see actors below). The story follows an author, EBJ, as she writes a sex fantasy about a younger version of herself named Natasha Woode and a handsome billionaire, Hugh Hansen.

Synopsis
With a weekend free from her husband and children, fledgling writer, E.B. Janet, decides to write a sex fantasy. Her story centers around a younger version of herself, Natasha Woode.  Woode, a 22-year-old virgin, finds herself the object of an affection for a young billionaire Hugh Hansen, who introduces her to BDSM and erotic spanking.

Productions
Spank! The Fifty Shades Parody opened in Springfield, Massachusetts in October 2012.  A national US tour began touring in January 2013, with an Australian tour beginning in March 2013.  The Australian production stars Rebecca De Unamuno, Stephen Mahy and Caitlin Berry.

Cast and characters

References

External links
 Spank! official website
 Spank! on Facebook

2012 musicals
Musical parodies
Musicals based on novels
BDSM-related mass media